Cucq (unofficially also: Cucq-Trépied-Stella-Plage) is a commune in the Pas-de-Calais department in the Hauts-de-France region of France.

Geography
Cucq is made up of three villages: Cucq itself, the second village of Trépied in the north and the coastal resort of Stella-Plage to the west.

History
During the Merovingian period, the terrain presently occupied by Cucq, Le Touquet, Merlimont and Berck was either marshland or tidal.

Little by little, the sea withdrew and the marshes were covered by sand and the dunes.
The grass-covered dunes of Cucq and Trépied are the result of centuries of coastal movement.  The sand of the lower beach, blown by the wind at low tide, accumulated to form a cordon of dunes along the coast.

Origins of the names of Cucq and Trépied
Cucq or Cuc in Celtic meant "height, hill" or in Latin "fortified".  The town was originally situated on a dune slightly higher than others in the vicinity, from which the comparison and the name of Cucq or Cuck or Cucques has evolved.

Trépied is so-called because of the triangular outline of the town.

Creation of Le Touquet
In 1819, the government decided to sell the land of the former domain of the Abbey of  St. Josse, confiscated at the time of the French Revolution. 1600 hectares of the warrens of Trépied were sold in 1837 to Jean-Baptiste Daloz. Pine trees were planted over the entire plot of land. Most of this area became better-known later as Le Touquet, a separate commune, in 1912.

On the banks of the river Canche, the harbour of Trépied once boasted more than thirty fishing boats. 150 men lived from the sea, supplying fish to the markets of Amiens, Abbeville and Beauvais.

Stella-Plage
During the 20th century, Stella-Plage started to emerge as a tourist town.
From 1914 to 1920, plans for the foundation of Stella-Plage were put on hold by World War I but from 1925, Stella was inaugurated as a "Climatic Station" and attracted holiday-makers from Paris and Lille.

World War II saw Stella razed to the ground, save for two villas, that remained intact at the end of the conflict.

Population

Places of interest
Early each February, the beach is the scene of the motor-bike races known as the Enduropal (formerly the Enduro of Le Touquet).

Notable people
 Matthieu Bataille, judo champion of France 2006 and bronze medallist at the Judo World Championship 2007
 Pauline Parmentier, professional tennis player
 Michael Curtis "Yogi" Stewart, played in the NBA basketball league for the Atlanta Hawks
 Pauline Crammer, women's football player
 Ophélie David, skier

See also
Communes of the Pas-de-Calais department

References

External links

 Tourism Office of Stella-Plage 

Communes of Pas-de-Calais